The UEFA European Under-18 Championship 1962 Final Tournament was held in Romania.

Teams
The following teams entered the tournament:

 
 
 
 
 
 
 
 
 
 
 
 
 
 
  (host)
 
 
 
 

The 20th participant was  Brașov XI.

Group stage

Group A

Group B

Group C

Group D1

Group D2

Group D play-off

Semifinals

Third place match

Final

References

External links
Results by RSSSF

UEFA European Under-19 Championship
Under-18
1961–62 in Romanian football
1962
April 1962 sports events in Europe
20th century in Bucharest
Sports competitions in Bucharest
1962 in youth association football